That's the Way It Should Be is an album by Booker T. & the M.G.'s, their first since Universal Language, released in 1977.  The track "Cruisin'" won the Grammy Award for Best Pop Instrumental Performance. It features drummer Steve Jordan on 9 of the albums tracks whilst James Gadson played on 3 of the tracks. It is also the final album to feature bassist Donald "Duck" Dunn before his death in 2012 and also the most recent album the band has released and is also the final studio album they've released since going their separate ways in 2012 following Donald "Duck" Dunn's death

Track listing
"Slip Slidin'" (Steve Cropper, Booker T. Jones, Steve Jordan)
"Mo' Greens" (Steve Cropper, Booker T. Jones, Steve Jordan)
"Gotta Serve Somebody" (Bob Dylan)
"Let's Wait a While" (Melanie Andrews, James Harris III, Janet Jackson, Terry Lewis)
"That's the Way It Should Be" (Steve Cropper, Donald "Duck" Dunn, Booker T. Jones, Steve Jordan)
"Just My Imagination (Running Away with Me)" (Barrett Strong, Norman Whitfield)
"Camel Ride" (Steve Cropper, Donald "Duck" Dunn, Booker T. Jones, Steve Jordan)
"Have a Heart" (Bonnie Hayes)
"Cruisin'" (Steve Cropper, Donald "Duck" Dunn, Anton Fig, Booker T. Jones)
"I Can't Stand the Rain" (Don Bryant, Bernard Miller, Ann Peebles)
"Sarasota Sunset" (Steve Cropper, Donald "Duck" Dunn, Anton Fig, Booker T. Jones)
"I Still Haven't Found What I'm Looking For" (Bono, Adam Clayton, The Edge, Larry Mullen, Jr.)

Personnel
Booker T. & the M.G.s
 Booker T. Jones – keyboards
 Steve Cropper – guitar
 Donald Dunn – bass guitar
 Steve Jordan – drums
with:
 James Gadson - drums on "Let's Wait Awhile", "Have a Heart" and "I Still Haven't Found What I'm Looking For"

References

Booker T. & the M.G.'s albums
1994 albums
Albums produced by Booker T. Jones
Albums produced by Steve Cropper
Columbia Records albums